The 1989 Monaco Grand Prix was a Formula One motor race held at the Circuit de Monaco, Monte Carlo on 7 May 1989. It was the third race of the 1989 Formula One World Championship. The 77-lap race was won from pole position by Ayrton Senna, driving a McLaren-Honda, with teammate Alain Prost second and Stefano Modena third in a Brabham-Judd.

Qualifying

Pre-qualifying report
The field was one fewer in Monaco as Ferrari had elected not to run a second car to replace Gerhard Berger, who had been injured in an accident during the last race at Imola. However, unlike the similar situation at the first race in Brazil, no extra pre-qualifier would be allowed through to the main qualifying sessions, which here at Monaco would run with 29 cars.

Brabham again topped the time sheets during the Thursday morning pre-qualifying session, with Stefano Modena fastest, but the Dallara of Alex Caffi was only 0.141 seconds behind. Third was Pierre-Henri Raphanel, who put in a fine performance in his Coloni, pre-qualifying for the first, and ultimately, only time. The fourth pre-qualifier was the other Brabham, driven by Martin Brundle, who edged out the Osella of Piercarlo Ghinzani by just two-hundredths of a second.

Joining Ghinzani on the sidelines were Stefan Johansson in the Onyx, then Nicola Larini in the other Osella, followed by Bernd Schneider in the Zakspeed. Ninth was the other Onyx of Bertrand Gachot, ahead of the sole EuroBrun driven by Gregor Foitek. The Rial of Volker Weidler was eleventh, followed by Aguri Suzuki in the other Zakspeed. Slowest on this occasion was Joachim Winkelhock in the AGS.

Pre-qualifying classification

Qualifying report
Tyrrell had new cars that looked promising. Ayrton Senna was on pole by a full second over teammate Alain Prost with Thierry Boutsen sharing row two with the surprisingly competitive Brabham of Martin Brundle. Nigel Mansell was fifth followed by Derek Warwick, Riccardo Patrese, Stefano Modena, Alex Caffi, and Andrea de Cesaris. 

It was at this race that many in the paddock started noticing that the Pirelli qualifying tyres were superior to Goodyear's (the Brabhams and Caffi's Dallara ran on Pirelli rubber).

Qualifying classification

Race

Race report

The first start was aborted when Patrese stalled his Williams. At the second start, for which Patrese was relegated to the back of the grid, Senna was first into Sainte-Dévote and Prost could do nothing but slot behind him. The McLarens proceeded to pull away from the field, while behind them Williams were in all sorts of trouble, as both Boutsen and Patrese had to stop for new rear wings. Nigel Mansell went out on lap 20 with more gearbox issues for Ferrari and one of the talking points of the race came on lap 33 when de Cesaris attempted to pass Nelson Piquet at Loews Hairpin. The predictable accident occurred and some choice words were exchanged between the two drivers (while still in their respective cars) and a huge traffic jam was caused. Brundle was looking good until he had to stop for a new battery and dropped back to seventh.

Senna continued to dominate the race while Prost, having been slowed by the Piquet-de Cesaris incident (he lost over 20 seconds to Senna in one lap having to wait for clear road to get moving again), could not recover and finished second behind his team mate. He was also held up for many laps trying to lap the Ligier of former Renault team mate René Arnoux who ignored both his mirrors and the blue flags prompting BBC commentator James Hunt to describe Arnoux's explanation of why he was so slow as "Bullshit" on live television. It was Senna's second win at Monaco and he did it the hard way, his McLaren losing first and second gear later in the race and disguising it to his best so Prost wouldn't react and push for the lead. Modena benefited from Brundle's stop and finished third, scoring his first points in Formula One and Brabham's last podium finish. Alex Caffi, Michele Alboreto, and Brundle, who was promoted to sixth on the final lap as a result of the retirement of Ivan Capelli, completed the point scoring positions. Caffi achieved both his and Dallara's first points.

Race classification

Championship standings after the race

Drivers' Championship standings

Constructors' Championship standings

References

Monaco Grand Prix
Monaco Grand Prix
Grand Prix
Monaco Grand Prix